10th Anniversary Album is an original jazz compilation by Nat King Cole. It was released in 1955.

Track listing 
LP side A:
"Dream a Little Dream of Me" (Wilbur Schwandt, Fabian Andre, Gus Kahn) – 2:54
"There I've Said It Again" (David Mann, Redd Evans) – 3:11
"Lulubelle" (Nat "King" Cole) – 2:15
"I'm an Errand Boy for Rhythm" (Cole) – 2:20
"The Love Nest" (Otto Harbach, Walter Hirsch) – 2:35
"But All I've Got Is Me" (Cole, Don George) – 2:51
"Peaches" (Terry Gibbs) – 2:40
"I Can't Be Bothered" (Gene Austin) – 2:45
LP side B:
"Too Soon" – 2:41
"Rough Ridin'" (Ella Fitzgerald, Ollie Jones, William Tennyson) – 2:51
"The Story of My Wife" – 2:37
"Sleeping Beauty" – 2:36
"Lovelight" – 3:15
"Where Were You?" – 2:18
"Mother Nature and Father Time" (Kay Twomey, Ben Weisman, Fred Wise) – 3:11
"Wish I Were Somebody Else" (Jimmy Van Heusen) – 2:44

Personnel 
 Nat King Cole – Vocals

References 
 Capitol Records EAP 514 – album of four 7-inch 45rpm EPs
 Capitol Records W 514 
 A Pile o' Cole Nat King Cole Website

Nat King Cole albums
1955 albums
Capitol Records compilation albums